Hoseynabad (also Romanized as Ḩoseynābād) is a village in Zarrin Rural District, Kharanaq District, Ardakan County, Yazd Province, Iran. At the 2006 census, its population was 29, in 10 families.

References 

Populated places in Ardakan County